The 2009 season is Chonburi's 4th season in the Thai Premier League of Chonburi Football Club.

Pre-season and friendlies

Kor Royal Cup

Thai Premier League

League table

Thai FA Cup

AFC Cup

Group G Table

Knockout phase

Squad statistics

Transfers

In

Out

Loan in

Loan out

Chonburi
2009